Al Asfour  (العصفور, "The Sparrow") is a 1972 film directed by Youssef Chahine, with Ali Badrakhan as second director.

Synopsis 
June, 1967, on the eve of the Six-Day War. The Sparrow follows a young police officer stationed in a small village in Upper Egypt whose inhabitants suffer the harassment of a corrupt businessman. The police officer crosses paths with a journalist who is investigating what appears to be a scandal involving the theft of weapons and war machinery by high officials. Youssef Chahine offers us a portrait of the “sparrows”, the simple people of his country whom others use to get rich.

References

External links 
 

1972 films
Algerian drama films
Egyptian drama films
Films directed by Youssef Chahine